Baguio longganisa is a Filipino pork sausage originating from the city of Baguio. It is a type of hamonado (sweet) longganisa.

See also
Pinuneg
 List of sausages
Baguio longganisa is not just the sweet "hamonado" type but they also have the "recado", garlicky salty kind.

References

Philippine sausages